Yang Bo (born October 11, 1983) is a Chinese boxer who won bronze at the Asian Championships 2006 at flyweight.

He upset world champion Lee Ok-Sung but lost in the semifinal to Violito Payla by RSCO.

2005 at the World Championships in his home country he lost in the first round to Juan Carlos Payano 22:36.

Life experience
Yang Bo received boxing training at Baotou Sports School in Inner Mongolia in 1995. The coach is Dan Yongqiang. Three years later, he went to Guangdong to continue to participate in training, with Dong Tingjiang as his coach. In 2005, he got a chance to be promoted to the national team, with Zhang Chuanliang as his coach.

In the same year, Yang Bo defeated his Shanghai opponent with a 39:24 result in the 51 kg sub-item final of the Boxing Event of the Tenth National Games and won one of the three gold medals in the boxing competition for the People's Liberation Army. In December of the same year, he eliminated the 2005 World Championship winner with 41:21 points in the quarter-finals of the 51 kg sub-item of the Doha Asian Games. South Korea's Lee Ok Sung advanced to the semi-finals and eventually won a bronze medal after losing to his opponent in the Philippines.

In March 2007, Yang Bo won the national championship. He was eliminated in the last eight of the world championships. In June, he finished third at the Asian Championships in Mongolia. At the 11th National Games two years later, Yang took part in the same event, but he was eliminated in the last eight and was unable to defend his gold medal.

References

External links
Results 2006

1983 births
Living people
People from Inner Mongolia
Sportspeople from Inner Mongolia
Flyweight boxers
Asian Games medalists in boxing
Boxers at the 2006 Asian Games
Chinese male boxers
Asian Games bronze medalists for China
Medalists at the 2006 Asian Games